Peebles was an American chain of department stores owned by Stage Stores, Inc. and headquartered in Houston, Texas.

Peebles operated stores mainly in the eastern and upper-midwestern  United States areas of Alabama, Connecticut, Delaware, Florida, Georgia, Illinois, Indiana, Iowa, Kentucky, Maryland, Massachusetts, Michigan, Minnesota, Mississippi, New Hampshire, New Jersey, New York, North Carolina, Ohio, Pennsylvania, Tennessee, Vermont, Virginia, West Virginia & Wisconsin.

The store specialized in retailing on-trend men's, women's, and children's apparel, accessories, cosmetics, footwear, and housewares. Brands exclusively found at Peebles included Valerie Stevens; Signature Studio; Sun River; Rustic Blue; Rebecca Malone; and Wishful Park.

History

Peebles was founded in 1891 by William Smith Peebles, who opened his first store in Lawrenceville, Virginia. 

Peebles mainly concentrated on small towns that didn’t have department stores, thus avoiding bigger cities and higher rents. 

In 1981 the company acquired The Collins Company, a line of mid-priced, comparable stores. Collins was based in Charlotte, North Carolina. 

The family sold the company in 1986 for $85 million to two investment banking firms and to Peebles’ senior management. 

The company had been sold twice before Stage Stores acquired Peebles in 2003 when it was based in South Hill, Virginia. At the time, Peebles had more than 125 stores primarily in the Mid-Atlantic, Southeastern and Midwest states.

After decades of expansion Peebles acquired  the Nashville-based upscale Harveys Department Stores chain in September 1988, renaming the stores as Peebles.

In 1998, Peebles purchased Watson's, a similar chain, later renaming all the Watson's stores as Peebles.

Houston-based Stage Stores purchased Peebles for $167 million in cash and $46.9 million in debt in 2003. In August 2019, it was announced that all Peebles stores, along with all other stores operated by Stage Stores Inc, would be converted into Gordmans stores.

On May 10, 2020, Stage announced it had filed for Chapter 11 bankruptcy, and that it would liquidate all locations, Peebles and Gordmans included, unless a buyer could be found for the chain. No buyer had been found, and going out of business sales began at all locations.

References

External links
 Official website (Archive)

1891 establishments in Virginia
2020 disestablishments in Virginia
Brunswick County, Virginia
Companies based in Houston
Retail companies established in 1891
Companies that filed for Chapter 11 bankruptcy in 2020
Retail companies disestablished in 2020
Defunct department stores based in Texas
Economy of the Midwestern United States
Mecklenburg County, Virginia
American companies established in 1891
American companies disestablished in 2020